Emília Janečková-Muríňová (22 August 1918, Vienna – 25 December 2012) was a Slovak politician. 

She was appointed Commissioner for Health and Social Welfare (equivalent to minister) in 1950.

References

1918 births
2012 deaths
Politicians from Vienna
Government ministers of Czechoslovakia